Local Urban Observatories (LUOs) were first conceived by Dr Joe Flood , as a successor to the Housing and  Urban Indicators Programme of the United Nations Centre for Human Settlements (UN-Habitat). A motion of the UN Commission for Human Settlements called for the institution of a Global Urban Observatory that would co-ordinate a network of local and national Urban Observatories to collect, analyse and promulgate policy-relevant data for cities and countries while sharing experiences. The form, organisation and activities of these observatories were to be left to the countries and cities involved, except that they were required to collect urban indicators for international comparisons, similar to those collected for the Habitat II Conference in 1996. 

An associated initiative by the United Nations Development Programme in Saudi Arabia developed a LUO in the planning region of Al-Madinah, the area surrounding Medina, the birthplace of the Prophet Mohammed. This observatory was well-designed and well-funded, and proved particularly effective in collecting data for management of the annual Hajj or Islamic Pilgrimage to Mecca. The LUO became a textbook example of good practice and co-operation in urban policy indicators and data monitoring. The Al-Madinah observatory was replicated at a number of other sites in Saudi Arabia.

Origins 
The Al-Madinah region has a population of 1.5 million people but receives 7 million pilgrim visitors annually as part of the Hajj. In 2003, UNDP Riyadh commissioned Dr Joe Flood to design an urban observatory for Al-Madinah within the local Department of Regional Planning and to develop specific indicators for the region. Flood laid down an institutional framework, a staffing plan and a work plan, and conducted a consultative seminar to develop local indicators for the city. Participatory indicators development was made more difficult by language issues and the necessity to maintain strict gender separation, but seminars were conducted successfully with the aid of Egyptian consultants who were trained by Dr Flood. The plan stressed that a proper institutional framework with solid networking among all the involved stakeholders was necessary for a sustainable and effective organisation. Consultations were held with a number of non-governmental organisations who required better data for their operations. 

The Madinah Urban Observatory Network (MOUN) was the first of its kind in the Middle East. A director, Dr Ahmed Farid Moustafa, was hired and during 2003-2008 the LUO plan was implemented. 

MOUN became instrumental in the formulation and execution of development plans for Al-Madinah. It kept the public and organisations informed about conditions in the region, and it became a recognized center of excellence and expertise in monitoring urban indicators. 

From its inception the LUO provided in-country representation for the Global Urban Observatory at UN-Habitat. It acted as a conduit for international data monitoring for the Millennium Development Goals, which include poverty alleviation and the upgrading of informal settlements. In 2009 the MOUN program received a UN-Habitat Scroll of Honour Award for pioneering the Local Observatory System in the Middle East.

Replication 
MAUN soon provided expert consultations to other sub-regional planning commissions in the Kingdom of Saudi Arabia and the Arab Gulf States region. Before this, regional planning in Saudi Arabia had mostly been conducted by international consultants, but MOUN provided an opportunity for direct involvement in planning by qualified Saudi nationals, especially women. From 2007 to 2013 urban observatories were established progressively in most regions.

The Al-Makkah LUO, established in 2009, has had a particularly important role in establishing demand for various goods and services by millions of Hajj and Umrah pilgrims. The following year, a National Urban Observatory was established to coordinate the operations of the various LUOs. Regulatory controls were set for good practice in 2020, mainstreaming the role of the network in Saudi Arabia. 

In 2013 the Riyadh Urban Observatory was formed, to monitor urban planning processes in Saudi Arabia's capital city. It was nominated as one of eight Global City Data Hubs by the World Council on City Data, and received ISO 37120 golden certification. A participatory training on evidence-based decision-making for sustainable urban development was conducted in 2021, with UNDP support.

The presence of the LUO network enabled the municipalities of 17 major Saudi cities to establish the Future Saudi Cities Programme, modernising urban and regional planning processes in the Kingdom through an evidence-based approach. The first report of the Programme demonstrated current and emerging challenges across the national city network.

In 2019 MAUN calculated the City Prosperity Index in Medina, a modification of the City Development Index. The index was subsequently constructed for the other major cities of Saudi Arabia.

References 

Urban studies and planning schools
Cities in Saudi Arabia
Economic indicators
United Nations Development Group